All Dogs is a pop punk quartet from Columbus, Ohio. Its members are singer/guitarist Maryn Jones, who has also played with Saintseneca, drummer Jesse Wither, who has also played with the punk band Delay, bassist Amanda Bartley of the band Swearin’, and guitarist Nick Harris, who also played in the Philadelphia based band Slaughter Beach, Dog.

History
All Dogs was founded in 2012, and released their first cassette in July 2013, as their half of a split cassette with Slouch, another Ohio band. On this cassette, All Dogs contributed 6 songs, 5 of which were originals and one of which was a cover. In 2015, the band released their debut album, Kicking Every Day, on Salinas Records.

Critical reception
All Dogs' debut cassette was described by Pitchfork Media as "pierced with a strong sense of yearning." Liz Perry wrote in Stereogum that the six songs All Dogs included on the cassette "contain more perfect anxiousness and earnestness than some bands can get out in a whole album." Laura Snapes, writing for Pitchfork, gave Kicking Every Day a rating of 7.6 out of 10, and described it as "a warm thump of encouragement from an equally grubby hand." Sasha Geffen, of Consequence of Sound, gave the album a B- and said that it "roils with internal confusions and frustrations," and that it is "awfully charming for something that’s eating itself alive from the inside." On April 1, 2016, lead vocalist of punk rock band Green Day posted a short clip of All Dogs' live performance on Instagram with the description "ALL DOGS!!!! great band".

Discography

Albums
Kicking Every Day - Salinas Records, LP, MP3 (2015)

EPs
All Dogs - Salinas Records, 7", MP3 (2013)

Split Releases
Split with Slouch - Self Released, Cassette, MP3 (2013)

References

Musical groups from Columbus, Ohio
Musical groups established in 2012
Pop punk groups from Pennsylvania
2012 establishments in Ohio
Pop punk groups from Ohio